The 1964 NAIA World Series was the eighth annual tournament hosted by the National Association of Intercollegiate Athletics to determine the national champion of baseball among its member colleges and universities in the United States and Canada.

The tournament was played at Phil Welch Stadium in St. Joseph, Missouri.

West Liberty State (27-7) defeated Grambling (24-5) in the championship series, 6–4 and 3–2, to win the Hilltoppers' first NAIA World Series. West Liberty State, who lost its first game of the tournament, won six consecutive games out of the consolation bracket to claim the title.

West Liberty State pitcher Frank Ujcich was named tournament MVP.

Bracket

 † Mayville State's games were all ruled forfeits, with their opponents awarded 9–0 victories.

See also
 1964 NCAA University Division baseball tournament

Reference

NAIA World Series
NAIA World Series
NAIA World Series